Edward Alexander Panelli (born November 23, 1931) is a former Associate Justice of the Supreme Court of California who served from December 24, 1985, to May 3, 1994.

Biography
Panelli was born in Santa Clara, California, received his B.S. Degree from Santa Clara University and J.D. degree from Santa Clara University School of Law. After graduation, he engaged in private practice with Pasquinelli & Panelli.

In 1972, Panelli was named judge of the Santa Clara County Superior Court, serving until 1983. He was then made Associate Justice, First District Court of Appeal, 1983–1984, and Presiding Justice, Sixth District Court of Appeal, 1984–1985.

In 1985, Panelli was appointed to the California Supreme Court by Governor George Deukmejian. His notable opinions include Moore v. Regents of the University of California (1990), which held by that a person's discarded blood and tissue taken for medical tests are not one's personal property, and researchers do not need to share profits from their use in research or commercialization. Another notable case opinion is Jolly v. Eli Lilly (1988), in which the court held a one-year statute of limitations began running on the date of discovery of the injury. In 1989, Panelli voted with the majority in Thing v. La Chusa, and in 1992 concurred in the results in Knight v. Jewett and Mexicali Rose v. Superior Court.

Following his retirement from the bench in 1994, he became an arbitrator and mediator.

Honors and legacy
In 1986, he was awarded an Honorary Doctor of Laws by his alma mater, Santa Clara University, where he serves on the Board of Trustees. There is an annual golf tournament in his name to raise money for law school scholarships.

References

Video
 Edward Panelli videos on C-SPAN.

External links
 Edward A. Panelli. California Supreme Court Historical Society.
 Supreme Court opinions written by Edward A. Panelli. Courtlistener.com.
 Past & Present Justices. California State Courts.
 Justices and Former Justices. California Court of Appeal, Sixth District.
 List of Past and Present Justices. California Court of Appeal, First District.

See also
 List of justices of the Supreme Court of California

1931 births
Living people
Santa Clara University alumni
Santa Clara University School of Law alumni
American jurists
Superior court judges in the United States
Judges of the California Courts of Appeal
Justices of the Supreme Court of California
20th-century American judges
20th-century American lawyers
People from Santa Clara, California
California Republicans